Lucas is a 1986 American romantic comedy-drama film written and directed by The Omen writer David Seltzer in his debut as a director and starring Corey Haim, Kerri Green, Charlie Sheen, and Courtney Thorne-Smith. Thorne-Smith and Winona Ryder made their film debuts in Lucas.

Plot
Lucas Blye is an intelligent 14-year-old high school student in suburban Chicago. He becomes acquainted with Maggie, an attractive older girl who has just moved to town. After meeting Lucas on one of his entomological quests, Maggie befriends him, spending time with him during the remainder of the summer until school begins.

Lucas, who finds himself a frequent victim of bullying and teasing, has a protector of sorts in Cappie Roew, an older student and football player. Cappie was once one of Lucas' tormentors, until Cappie contracted hepatitis and Lucas, for reasons no one ever knew, brought him his homework every day, ensuring that Cappie did not fail and have to repeat a year of school.

Even though Lucas deems it beneath her, Maggie becomes a cheerleader for the football team in order to get closer to Cappie, on whom she has a growing crush. Angered and offended by Maggie's inattention towards him, Lucas begins to chastise Maggie, continuing to dismiss her cheerleading as "superficial" and incorrectly assuming that she will be his date to an upcoming school dance. Maggie complains to Lucas that she's interested in activities other than being with him.

On the night of the dance, Cappie is dumped by his girlfriend Alise over his attraction to Maggie, which she has been noticing. A depressed Cappie finds comfort with Maggie at her house—much to the chagrin of Lucas, who has arrived, in tuxedo, to pick her up for the dance. Even though Cappie and Maggie invite him out for pizza, he rebukes them and rides off on his bike. Rina, one of Lucas' friends, encounters Lucas as he sits alone, watching the dance from across a lake. Although she has feelings for Lucas, she puts them aside to console him about he and Maggie being "from two different worlds". On the way home, Lucas happens to ride by the pizza parlor and is crushed to see Maggie and Cappie kissing on their date.

In a last-ditch attempt to impress Maggie and gain the respect he so desperately craves, the diminutive Lucas joins the football team. In the shower after practice, Lucas endures yet another prank from his constant tormentors Bruno and Spike. At the end of the day, Lucas flees in embarrassment to his favorite hiding place (beneath a railroad overpass near the school) and Maggie chases him to talk with him. After Maggie tells him that she wants him to be her friend, Lucas tries to kiss her. Maggie recoils, and a heartbroken Lucas screams at her to leave.

The next day at the football game, Lucas removes his helmet during a play and is seriously injured after being tackled and is rushed to the hospital. Maggie, Cappie, and Rina attempt to contact Lucas' parents, though Maggie discovers that she does not know Lucas as well as she thought she did. Correcting Maggie's misguided impression that Lucas lives in the large luxurious house where she has seen him several times, Rina shows them that Lucas lives in a dilapidated trailer in a junkyard with his alcoholic father and only works as a gardener at the large house.

Meanwhile, Lucas' schoolmates hold vigil for him in the hospital as he recuperates. Maggie visits Lucas' room that evening and sternly tells him never to play football again. Lucas promises, and the two reconcile, picking up their friendship where they left off. Lucas and Maggie speculate as to where they will be when the locusts return seventeen years later; both express the hope that they will still be in touch when the locusts return again.

Lucas returns to school a short time after his recovery, with schoolmates all casting surprised looks at him as he walks through the hall. Upon reaching his locker, he finds Bruno and Spike there waiting for him, but he tries to ignore them as he opens his locker. Inside is a varsity letter jacket, with Lucas's name and number on the back. As Lucas takes it out in shock, Bruno starts the "slow clap", and the entire hallway starts applauding. Maggie, Cappie, Cash, and Rina are there as well, leading the applause as Lucas raises his arms triumphantly and smiles.

Cast

 Corey Haim as Lucas Blye
 Kerri Green as Maggie
 Charlie Sheen as Cappie Roew
 Courtney Thorne-Smith as Alise
 Ciro Poppiti as Ben
 Winona Ryder as Rina
 Tom Hodges as Bruno
 Guy Boyd as Coach
 Jeremy Piven as Spike
 Garrett M. Brown as Mr. Kaiser

Reception
Reviews for Lucas were generally positive. Based on 22 reviews collected by the film review aggregator Rotten Tomatoes, 73% of critics gave Lucas a positive review and the film has an average score of 6.5/10. On Metacritic, it has a weighted average score of 75 out of 100 based on 11 critics, indicating "generally favorable reviews". Roger Ebert gave the film 4 out of 4 stars, calling it a film "about teenagers who are looking how to be good with each other, to care, and not simply to be filled with egotism, lust and selfishness, which is all most Hollywood movies think teenagers can experience". Ebert later included the film in his top 10 films of 1986.

The film was not considered a box office success, grossing $8,200,000 in the United States. Both Corey Haim and Kerri Green were nominated for a Young Artist Award in 1987.

The film is ranked at number 16 on Entertainment Weeklys list of the 50 Best High School Movies.

References

External links

 
 
 

1986 films
1986 comedy-drama films
1986 directorial debut films
1980s coming-of-age comedy-drama films
1980s high school films
1980s romantic comedy-drama films
1980s sports comedy-drama films
1980s teen comedy-drama films
1980s teen romance films
20th Century Fox films
American coming-of-age comedy-drama films
American romantic comedy-drama films
American sports comedy-drama films
American teen comedy-drama films
American teen romance films
Coming-of-age romance films
Films directed by David Seltzer
Films scored by Dave Grusin
Films set in Chicago
Films shot in Illinois
High school football films
Films about puberty
1980s English-language films
1980s American films